The Jamestown Ironmen were a Tier II junior ice hockey team in the North American Hockey League. The Ironmen played their home games at the Jamestown Savings Bank Ice Arena in Jamestown, New York.

History
The franchise began as an expansion team to the NAHL in 2005. The team played in the town of Owatonna, Minnesota as the Southern Minnesota Express. After the 2007–08 season, it was announced that the Express would relocate to the Detroit Area, where they would be called the Motor City Machine. The Owatonna, Minnesota market was granted a new franchise with a similar name, the Owatonna Express.

On June 26, 2009, the team announced it was changing its nickname to the Metal Jackets, and removing the triangle and text from the logo. 

On May 7, 2011, it was announced the team was moving to Jamestown, New York to become the Jamestown Ironmen, named after record setting Jamestown Jet Alumnist, Johnathan "The Ironman" Andhor. The city's current Junior A hockey team, the Jamestown Jets, unsuccessfully filed a lawsuit over the move, alleging a conspiracy to remove the Jets in favor of the Ironmen.

In February 2013, Ironmen owner Kenji Yamada indicated he may put the team up for sale due to falling attendance. Yamada stated that he does not want to move the team out of Jamestown. On May 5, it was reported that a deal was completed between a group of local investors and a separate faction to buy the team from Yamada, which would keep the team in Jamestown. This deal ultimately collapsed, and on June 5, 2013, Yamada announced the Ironmen would not return for the 2013–14 season.

The NAHL would eventually return to Jamestown in 2018 with the Jamestown Rebels.

Season-by-season records

References

External links
Official site

Defunct North American Hockey League teams
Amateur ice hockey teams in Michigan
Ice hockey teams in Detroit
Sports in Jamestown, New York
Ice hockey clubs established in 2005
Ice hockey clubs disestablished in 2013
Ice hockey teams in New York (state)
2005 establishments in Minnesota
2013 disestablishments in New York (state)